Abbott is a city in Hill County, Texas, United States. The population was 352 in 2020.

History
Abbott was founded in 1871 as a stop for the Missouri-Kansas-Texas Railroad and was named for Joseph Abbott, who represented the area in the Texas legislature at the time. Its population peaked at 713 in 1914 and has declined since. The city was incorporated in 1916.

Geography and climate
Abbott is located on Interstate 35, about 24 miles north of Waco, and is at  (31.883865, −97.075680). The city has a humid subtropical climate (Köppen climate classification Cfa), similar to nearby cities such Dallas and Waco.

Demographics

As of the census of 2000, there were 300 people, 124 households, and 89 families residing in the city. The population density was 518.0 people per square mile (199.7/km2). There were 144 housing units at an average density of 248.6 per square mile (95.9/km2). The racial makeup of the city was 96.00% White, 1.00% African American, 3.00% from other races. Hispanic or Latino of any race were 5.67% of the population.

There were 124 households, out of which 29.8% had children under the age of 18 living with them, 62.9% were married couples living together, 6.5% had a female householder with no husband present, and 28.2% were non-families. 27.4% of all households were made up of individuals, and 16.9% had someone living alone who was 65 years of age or older. The average household size was 2.42 and the average family size was 2.97.

In the city, the population was spread out, with 21.3% under the age of 18, 6.7% from 18 to 24, 28.3% from 25 to 44, 20.3% from 45 to 64, and 23.3% who were 65 years of age or older. The median age was 40 years. For every 100 females, there were 87.5 males. For every 100 females age 18 and over, there were 88.8 males.

The median income for a household in the city was $37,917, and the median income for a family was $55,625. Males had a median income of $38,750 versus $20,000 for females. The per capita income for the city was $19,062. About 6.0% of families and 8.2% of the population were below the poverty line, including 2.7% of those under the age of 18 and 13.0% of those 65 or over.

In 2010 Abbott had a population of 356.  The racial and ethnic makeup was 91.0% non-Hispanic white, 2.0% black or African American, 1.1% Native American, 0.3% Asian, 0.3% reporting two or more races and 6.5% Hispanic or Latino.

Education
The City of Abbott is served by the Abbott Independent School District and home to the Abbott High School Panthers. In 2015 there were 300 students in Pre-Kindergarten through 12th grade.

Notable people

 Bobbie Nelson (1931-2022), Willie Nelson's sister; pianist
 Willie Nelson (born 1933), American singer-songwriter and actor (born in Abbott)

References

External links

 Abbott in the Handbook of Texas

Cities in Texas
Cities in Hill County, Texas
Populated places established in 1871
1871 establishments in Texas